The 2014 season of the Polish American Football League was the ninth season played by the american football leagues in Poland.

Regular season of the Topliga took place between March 29 and July 6, 2014. The Polish champion was determined in the play-off final - the IX SuperFinal PLFA (known as the Polish Bowl IX). The Seahawks Gdynia beat the Panthers Wrocław in the championship game 41–32 hosted at the Olympic Stadium in Wrocław.

Topliga

Results table

Standings

Postseason

PLFA I

Standings

Postseason

See also
 2014 in sports

References

External links
 Polish American Football Association

Polish American Football League seasons
Poland
PLFA